Sam Oomen (born 15 August 1995) is a Dutch racing cyclist, who currently rides for UCI WorldTeam .

Career
He rode at the 2014 UCI Road World Championships in the U23 category. In October 2015 it was announced that he would join  from 2016 on an initial three-year contract. He was named in the startlist for the 2017 Vuelta a España, where he was forced to leave with illness.

2018
He started the season by racing in the Tour Down Under, where he finished in 15th overall and was 24 seconds behind the winning time. Oomen led  at the Volta ao Algarve. In May 2018, he was named in the startlist for the Giro d'Italia, which he finished in ninth place, while riding in support for Tom Dumoulin.

Major results

2012
 1st  Overall Grand Prix Rüebliland
1st Young rider classification
1st Stage 3 (ITT)
2013
 1st  Time trial, National Junior Road Championships
 2nd Overall Junior Tour of Wales
 5th Overall Le Trophee Centre Morbihan
 10th Overall Grand Prix Rüebliland
2014
 1st  Mountains classification, Tour de Bretagne
 3rd Paris–Tours Espoirs
 8th Overall Tour des Fjords
2015
 1st  Overall Rhône-Alpes Isère Tour
1st  Points classification
1st  Young rider classification
1st Stage 1
 1st Paris–Tours Espoirs
 2nd Overall Tour des Pays de Savoie Mont-Blanc
1st  Mountains classification
1st  Young rider classification
1st Stages 2 & 4 (ITT)
 2nd Overall Tour Alsace
1st  Young rider classification
 3rd Flèche Ardennaise
 4th Overall Istrian Spring Trophy
 4th Overall Tour de l'Avenir
 8th Overall Tour de l'Ain
 8th Liège–Bastogne–Liège Espoirs
2016
 1st  Overall Tour de l'Ain
1st  Young rider classification
1st Stage 3
 3rd Overall Critérium International
 10th Overall Tour du Poitou-Charentes
2017
 1st  Team time trial, UCI Road World Championships
 6th Tre Valli Varesine
 7th Overall Tour de Pologne
 9th Overall Tour of California
2018
 1st  Young rider classification, Volta ao Algarve
 2nd  Team time trial, UCI Road World Championships
 7th Overall Tour de Suisse
 9th Overall Giro d'Italia
 9th Overall Tour de Pologne
2019
 5th Overall Volta ao Algarve
 9th Overall Tirreno–Adriatico
1st  Young rider classification
2021
 8th Overall Tour de Suisse
2022
 1st Stage 1 (TTT) Vuelta a España
 5th Road race, National Road Championships
 10th Overall Volta a Catalunya

General classification results timeline
Sources:

References

External links

 
 
 
 
 

1995 births
Living people
Dutch male cyclists
Sportspeople from Tilburg
UCI Road World Championships cyclists for the Netherlands
Cyclists from North Brabant